Abdul Matin Sarkar is a Bangladesh Awami League politician and the former Member of Parliament of Mymensingh-7.

Career
Sarkar was a member of Mukti Bahini and fought in the Bangladesh Liberation war. In 1973, he was the vice-president of Trishal Nazrul Degree College Chhttra League. In 1990, he was elected Chairman of Trishal upazila. He was elected to parliament from Mymensingh-7 as a Bangladesh Awami League candidate in 2001.

References

Awami League politicians
Living people
8th Jatiya Sangsad members
Year of birth missing (living people)